Kastre Parish is a rural municipality in Tartu County, Estonia.

Settlements
Small boroughs
 Roiu
 Võnnu
Villages
 Aadami
 Aardla
 Aardlapalu
 Agali
 Ahunapalu
 Alaküla
 Aruaia
 Haaslava
 Hammaste
 Igevere
 Ignase
 Imste
 Issaku
 Järvselja
 Kaagvere
 Kaarlimõisa
 Kannu
 Kastre
 Kitseküla
 Koke
 Kriimani
 Kurepalu
 Kurista
 Kõivuküla
 Kõnnu
 Lange
 Liispõllu
 Lääniste
 Melliste
 Metsanurga
 Mõra
 Mäksa
 Mäletjärve
 Paluküla
 Poka
 Päkste
 Rookse
 Rõka
 Sarakuste
 Sudaste
 Tammevaldma
 Terikeste
 Tigase
 Tõõraste
 Uniküla
 Vana-Kastre
 Veskimäe
 Võruküla
 Võõpste

Religion

References

External links